Afif (also transliterated as Afeef) is a masculine Arabic given name, it may refer to:

Given name
 Afif Ayyub (born 1953), Lebanese diplomat
 Afif al-Bizri (1914-1994), Syrian military officer
 Afif Chaya (born 1947), Lebanese singer and actor
 Afif Safieh (born 1950), Palestinian diplomat

Surname
 Abu Sa'id al-Afif, Egyptian physician
 Abdullah Afeef (1916-1993), United Suvadive Republic politician

Arabic-language surnames
Arabic masculine given names